Karl Christian Agthe (16 June 1762 – 27 November 1797) was a German organist and composer.

Born in Hettstedt, Agthe served as court organist to Frederick Albrecht, Prince of Anhalt-Bernburg. Among his compositions are six Singspiele, a ballet, and piano sonatas. He died in Ballenstedt; a son, Albrecht Agthe, was a music teacher.

References

1762 births
1797 deaths
German classical organists
German male organists
German Classical-period composers
18th-century classical composers
18th-century keyboardists
German male classical composers
18th-century German composers
18th-century German male musicians
Male classical organists